Parța Neolithic Sanctuary refers to an excavated Neolithic cult-centre or shrine located on the right bank of the Timiș River at Parța, south of Timișoara, in Romania.

Description
The sanctuary has been dated to around 5000 BC and is considered part of the Vinča culture. It is part of a wider complex of buildings and domestic settlement. The sanctuary building had raised altar-like pedestals and life-size figurine heads together with specially built granary areas. Statues consisted of large clay humanoid figures. A life-sized sculpture of a double-headed goddess stood near the entrance. One of the smaller humanoid figures has horns. The finds strongly suggest a local bull-cult, as bull's horns are present everywhere in the sanctuary, and cattle skulls were placed on a clay platform.

Finds from the excavations, together with a reconstruction of the sanctuary, can be found in the Museum of Banat in Timișoara.

References

Archaeological sites in Romania
Vinča culture
Prehistoric sites in Romania